Edward (Nikk) Joseph Phelan is a notable figure in the profession of pharmacy in Australia, highlighted by his winning The Evans Medal For Merit in 1969 for outstanding contribution to the practice of hospital pharmacy (later known as the GlaxoSmithKline Medal of Merit).

Nikk began his career as a pharmacist in Queensland, undertaking his apprenticeship at the Friendly Societies’ Dispensary in Maryborough. He then practiced as a locum throughout Queensland before settling in Mackay. It was here that he partnered with Dr F. N. Hales to form National Products, a company to indent and supply reagent chemicals, scientific glassware and equipment to Queensland Sugar Mills.

Nikk spent some time as a Pharmaceutical Detailer following the dissolution of the business partnership in Mackay, before World War II broke out and he was directed by the Medical Co-ordination Committee to approved technical occupation. He became the chemist in charge of the emergency laboratory producing galenicals and preparations for pharmaceutical use, and also essences, food colours, and preservatives for the baking, confectionery and cordial making trades.

Following the end of the war, Nikk took up the position of pharmacist at Townsville General Hospital in 1954. At this time he took a keen interest in a number of pharmacy organisations, including the Miscellaneous Workers’ Union, forming and establishing the second sub-branch in Australia of the Miscellaneous Worker’s Union and was elected foundation president, a position he held until his relocation from Townsville to New South Wales in 1958.

Nikk’s relocation to New South Wales was to take up the position of Chief Pharmacist at the Sutherland District Hospital at Caringbah. It was here that he joined the Institutional and Industrial Pharmacists’ group and was elected to the committee. From here he joined with Mavis Sweeney, the only member of the Society of Hospital Chemists of Australia (now known as The Society of Hospital Pharmacists of Australia) and was elected foundation president of the New South Wales state branch of the now SHPA. In his time as president of the NSW branch, he lobbied the State Health Department to allow Bachelor of Pharmacy graduates to choose to undertake their pre-registration training in NSW state hospitals rather than in a community pharmacy, and successfully had the legislation amended.

Nikk was appointed to the Federal Council of the Society of Hospital Pharmacists of Australia shortly before he was awarded The Evans Medal of Merit in 1969.

References

Australian pharmacists
Year of birth missing
Year of death missing